The Rakhine (Burmese and , :), also known as the Arakanese, are a Southeast Asian ethnic group in Myanmar (Burma) forming the majority along the coastal region of present-day Rakhine State (formerly called Arakan), although Rakhine communities also exist throughout the country, particularly in Ayeyarwady and Yangon Regions. They constitute approximately 5.53% or more of Myanmar's total population, but no accurate census figures exist. Smaller Rakhine communities exist in Bangladesh's Chittagong Hill Tracts and in India, where they are known as the Marma and Mog peoples respectively.

Ethnonyms 
Rakhine (less commonly spelt Rakhaing) is the contemporary ethnonym and name of the region in Rakhine, Burmese, and English today. The word is extant to the mid-11th century, appearing on a pillar inscription at Shite-thaung Temple, and also appears in European, Persian, and Ceylonese accounts by the 15th century. U Kala's Maha Yazawin traces the word's etymology to Alaungsithu's conquest of the region during Pagan era, but epigraphic evidence to support the underlying theory remains scant. Arthur Phayre traces the etymology to the Sanskrit or Pali words for 'monster' or 'demon' ( and ) respectively, which is more likely. Some Rakhine inhabitants now prefer the alternative  spelling of ရက္ခိုင်.

Between the 17th and 18th centuries, the Rakhine began calling themselves Mranma (မြန်မာ) and its derivatives, as attested by texts like the Rakhine Minrazagri Ayedaw Sadan and the Dhanyawaddy Ayedawbon. The word, which is also cognate with Bamar and is the Rakhine pronunciation of "Myanmar," continues to be used by their descendants in Bangladesh, who are known as the Marma. By this period, the Bamar began to call the Rakhine the Myanmagyi (မြန်မာကြီး), as attested by contemporaneous Burmese and foreign sources. The ethnonym reflected their common ancestral kinship ties with the Buddhist-professing Bamar, with whom the Rakhine identified.

By 1585, European, Persian, and Bengali accounts began describing the Rakhine and Buddhist groups as the Magh and its derivatives (e.g., Mogh, Mugh, Mog, etc.). The word's etymology is likely to derive from Magadha, the name of an ancient Buddhist kingdom. By the late 19th century, British authorities adopted the ethnonym Arakanese. After 1991, the Burmese government changed the official English name of the ethnic group to Rakhine, as part of a broader effort to indigenize the country's English ethnonyms and place names.

Ancestral origins 
Beginning in 9th and 10th centuries, the people from Irrawaddy valley began migrating out, crossing the Arakan Mountains and settling in what is now Rakhine State. By the 1100s, they had consolidated control of the region, becoming a tributary state of the Pagan Empire until the 13th century. By the 15th century, these migrants had formed a distinct cultural identity through geographic isolation. Rakhine and Burmese are very closely related languages, which both descend from Old Burmese. Rakhine oral traditions and written records also describe several alternative origin myths, including one that traces the Rakhine back to an intermarriage between a highland Mro and a lowland queen, and another that traces the ancestry of Rakhine monarchs back to Mahasammata, the legendary first monarch of the world.

After the Kingdom of Mrauk U was annexed by the Konbaung Kingdom in 1784, Rakhine refugees began settling in Cox's Bazar and Patuakhali District. The British colonial officer of the East India Trading Company, Captain Hiram Cox, was given the task of providing land to the refugees in 1799. An estimated 100,000 refugees were settled in Cox's Bazar, Chittagong Hill Tracts, and Patuakhali by the East India Company government. They settled in Patuakhali District and Barguna District in the 19th century. Rakhine descendants spread as far north as Tripura state in India, where they are known as the Mog.

Geographic distribution 
Outside of Myanmar, there are a sizable Rakhine community in the southeast districts of Bangladesh, namely in Khagrachari, Rangamati, Bandarban and southern Cox's Bazar, with the Mong circle in Khagrachari having administrative duties. There is a small community of Rakhine people inhabiting the coastal areas of Patuakhali, Borguna and Cox's Bazar, having migrated to Bangladesh from Myanmar before the formation of these two contemporary countries. The total population of the community as of 2020 is 16,000. The Rakhine people and the local Bengali population developed a unique dialect through which they could communicate. The Rakhine people were able to preserve their culture, language, and religion in Bengal. Rakhines observe Rakhine festival such as Sanggreng and Nai-chai ka. The last Rakhine language school in Kuakata closed in 1998 due to shortage of funds, In January 2006, Chin Than Monjur, opened a Rakhine language community school which expanded into three news schools and used Rakhine language books from Myanmar. The schools were forced to close due to shortage of funds.

Persecution 
The 150-year old Khaddya Song Chansai Rakhine cemetery in Taltali Upazila, Barguna District, was forcefully taken by local land grabbers in 2017. The Rakhine population in the Barguna and Patuakhali Districts decreased by 95%, from 50,000 in the 20th century to 2,561 in 2014, with Rakhines leaving Bangladesh due to illegal land-grabbing and persecution. Lands owned by them in the districts decreased by 81%. Rakhine land is also being taken over by politicians in Patuakhali District.

Culture
The Rakhine are predominantly Theravada Buddhists and are one of the four main Buddhist ethnic groups of Burma (the others being the Burman, Shan and Mon people).  Rakhine culture is similar to the mainstream Burmese culture but with more Indian influence, likely due to its geographical isolation from the Burmese mainland divided by the Arakan Mountains and its closer proximity to India. Traces of Indian influence remain in many aspects of Arakanese culture, including its literature, music, and cuisine. The traditional Rakhine kyin wrestling also plays an important role in its culture. Rakhine mont di, consisting of rice vermicelli noodles, is popular across Myanmar.

Language
The Rakhine language is closely related to and generally mutually intelligible with Burmese. Notably, Rakhine retains an /r/ sound that has become /j/ in Burmese. Rakhine utilises the Burmese alphabet.

Notable Rakhine 

 Nay Toe, actor
 Kaiser, musician
 Pe Myint, government minister
 U Ottama, colonial activist and monk

See also
 History of Rakhine
 Kingdom of Mrauk U
 List of Arakanese monarchs
 Rohingya conflict

References

Bibliography
 
 
 
Loeffner, L. G. (1976). "Historical Phonology of Burmese and Arakanese Finals." Ninth International Conference on Sino-Tibetan Languages and Linguistics, Copenhagen. 22–24 Oct. 1976.

Ethnic groups in Myanmar
Rakhine State
History of Rakhine
Buddhist communities of Bangladesh
Buddhist communities of Myanmar
Buddhist communities of India
Sino-Tibetan-speaking people